Sir Fazle Hasan Abed  (27 April 1936 – 20 December 2019) was the founder of BRAC, one of the world's largest non-governmental organizations.

Early life
Abed was born on 27 April 1936 in the village of Baniachong, located in what is present-day Habiganj District, Sylhet, Bangladesh. He belonged to a Bengali Muslim family of Zamindars, known as the Hasan family, and was one of eight children of Siddiq Hasan and Syeda Sufia Khatun. Abed's maternal grandfather, Syed Moazzem Uddin Hossain, had served successively as ministers for agriculture and education for Bengal during the last years of British rule. His paternal great-uncle was Sir Syed Shamsul Huda, a member of the Imperial Legislative Council.
 
After passing intermediate from Dhaka College in 1954, Abed left home at the age of 18 to attend University of Glasgow, where, in an effort to break away from tradition and do something radically different, he studied naval architecture. He realized there was little work in ship building in East Pakistan and a career in Naval Architecture would make returning home difficult. With that in mind, Abed joined the Chartered Institute of Management Accountants in London, completing his professional education in 1962.

Abed returned to East Pakistan (now Bangladesh) to join Shell Oil Company and quickly rose to head its finance division. His time at Shell exposed Abed to the inner workings of a large conglomerate and provided him with insight into corporate management, which would become invaluable to him later in life.

It was during his time at Shell that the devastating cyclone of 1970 hit the south and south-eastern coastal regions of the country, killing 300,000 people. The cyclone had a profound effect on Abed. In the face of such devastation, he said the comforts and perks of a corporate executive's life ceased to have any attraction for him. Together with friends, Abed created HELP, an organisation that provided relief and rehabilitation to the worst affected in the island of Manpura, which had lost three-quarters of its population in the disaster.

Soon after, Bangladesh's own struggle for independence from Pakistan began and circumstances forced Abed to leave the country. He found refuge in the United Kingdom, where he set up Action Bangladesh to lobby the governments of Europe for his country's independence.

Formation of BRAC

When the Bangladesh Liberation War ended in December 1971, Abed sold his flat in London and returned to the newly independent Bangladesh. Hundreds of refugees who had sought shelter in India during the war had started to return home, and their relief and rehabilitation called for urgent efforts. Abed decided to use the funds he had generated from selling his flat to initiate an organisation to deal with the long-term task of improving the living conditions of the rural poor. He selected the remote region of Sulla in northeastern Bangladesh to start his work, and this work led to the non-governmental organisation known as BRAC in 1972.

BRAC grew to become one of the largest development organisations in the world in terms of the scale and diversity of its interventions.  The organization now operates in all 64 districts of Bangladesh through development interventions that range from education, healthcare, microfinance, skills, human rights, agriculture and enterprise development. In 2002, BRAC went international by taking its range of development interventions to Afghanistan. Since then, BRAC has expanded to a total of 10 countries across Asia and Africa, successfully adapting its unique integrated development model across varying geographic and socioeconomic contexts. It is now considered to be the largest non-profit in the world – both by employees and people served.

Professional positions
Abed held the following positions:
1972–2001 – Executive Director, BRAC
1981–1982 – Visiting Scholar, Harvard Institute of International Development, Harvard University, Cambridge, Mass.
1982–1986 – Senior Fellow, Bangladesh Institute of Development Studies (BIDS).
1982–1986 – Member, Board of Trustees, BIDS.
1982–1986 – Chairperson, Association of Development Agencies in Bangladesh (ADAB).
1986–1991 – Member, World Bank NGO Committee, Geneva, Switzerland.
1987–1990 – Chairperson, South Asia Partnership.
1987–1990 – Member, International Commission on Health Research for Development, Harvard University, Cambridge, Massachusetts, USA
1990–2009 – Chairperson, 'Campaign for Popular Education' (CAMPE), an NGO network on education.
1992–1993 – Member, Independent South Asian Commission on Poverty Alleviation
1992–2009 – Chairperson, NGO Forum for Drinking Water Supply & Sanitation
1993–2011 – Chairperson, Ain O Salish Kendra (ASK), a human rights organisation
1994–2019 – Member, Board of Trustees, Centre for Policy Dialogue (CPD), Dhaka
1998–2004 – Member, Board of Governors, Institute of Development Studies (IDS), Sussex University, UK
1998–2005 – Member, Policy Advisory Group, The Consultative Group to Assist the Poorest (CGAP), The World Bank, Washington, DC.
1999–2005 – Member, Board of Governors, International Rice Research Institute (IRRI), Los Banos, Philippines.
2000–2005 – Chair, Finance & Audit Committee, International Rice Research Institute (IRRI), Los Banos, Philippines.
2000–2019 – Chairperson, Governing Body, BRAC.
2001–2008 – Chairperson, Board of Directors, BRAC Bank Limited.
2001–2019 – Chairperson, Board of Trustees, BRAC University.
2002–2008 – Global Chairperson, International Network of Alternative Financial Institutions (INAFI) International.
2005–2019 – Commissioner, UN Commission on Legal Empowerment of the Poor (CLEP)
2010–2011 – UN Secretary General's Group of Eminent Persons for Least Developed Countries (LDCs)
2012–2019 – Member, UN Secretary General's Lead Group of the Scaling Up Nutrition (SUN) Movement
2015–2015 – Chairperson, Board of Directors, BRAC Saajan Exchange Limited
2015–2019 – Chairperson, Advisory Board, Bengal Institute for Architecture, Landscapes and Settlements.

Awards
The Ramon Magsaysay Award for Community Leadership, 1980
The Alan Shawn Feinstein World Hunger Award, 1990
The Maurice Pate Award by UNICEF, 1992
The Olof Palme Prize, 2001
The Social Entrepreneurship Award by the Schwab Foundation, 2002
The International Activist Award by the Gleitsman Foundation, 2003
The UNDP Mahbub ul Haq Award, 2004
The Henry R. Kravis Prize in Nonprofit Leadership, 2007
The Inaugural Clinton Global Citizen Award, 2007
Palli Karma Shahayak Foundation (PKSF) Lifetime Achievement in Social Development and Poverty Alleviation, 2007
The David Rockefeller Bridging Leadership Award, 2008
Knight Commander of the Order of St Michael and St George (KCMG), 2010
The WISE Prize for Education, 2011
 Open Society Prize, 2013
 Leo Tolstoy International Gold Medal by The Russian Children Foundation (RDF), 2014 
 World Food Prize, 2015 
 Thomas Francis, Jr. Medal in Global Public Health, 2016
 Jose Edgardo Campos Collaborative Leadership Award 2016 (South Asian Region), 2017
 Laudato Si' Award (Institution Category), 2017
 LEGO Prize, 2018
Yidan Prize, 2019

Honorary degrees

1994 – Honorary Doctorate of Laws, Queen's University, Canada
2003 – Honorary Doctorate of Education, University of Manchester, UK
2007 – Honorary Doctorate of Humane Letters, Yale University, US
2008 – Honorary Doctorate of Laws, Columbia University, US
2009 – Honorary Doctorate of Letters, University of Oxford, UK
2009 – Honorary Doctorate in Humane letters, Rikkyo University, Japan
2010 – Honorary degree of Doctor of Laws, University of Bath, UK
2012 – Doctor of Laws honoris causa, University of Manchester, UK
2014 – Honorary Degree of Doctor of Civil Law, Sewanee: The University of the South, US
2014 – Honorary Doctor of Laws, Princeton University, US
2016 – Honorary Degree of Doctor of Education, University of Bradford, UK

Death
He was admitted to the hospital in late November 2019 on account of breathing problems and physical weakness. He died at the Apollo Hospital (now Evercare Hospital Dhaka) in the capital on Friday, 20 December 2019. He was undergoing treatment for a malignant brain tumor. At the time of his death, he was 83 years old. He is survived by a wife, a daughter, a son and three grandchildren.

References

1936 births
2019 deaths

Bangladeshi emigrants to England
Bangladeshi social workers
Olof Palme Prize laureates
Alumni of the University of Glasgow
Knights Commander of the Order of St Michael and St George
Ashoka Bangladesh Fellows
Bangladeshi knights
Bengali knights
Dhaka College alumni
Honorary Fellows of Bangla Academy
Naturalised citizens of the United Kingdom
People from Baniachong Upazila
21st-century Bengalis
20th-century Bengalis
Agriculture and food award winners